Six Violin Concerti, Op. 6, is a set of concertos written by Antonio Vivaldi in 1712–1715. The set was first published in 1719 in Amsterdam.

Concerto No. 1 in G minor, RV 324
Allegro
Grave
Allegro
Concerto No. 2 in E Flat Major, RV 259
Allegro
Largo
Allegro
Concerto No. 3 in G minor, RV 318
Allegro
Adagio
Allegro
Concerto No. 4 in D Major, RV 216
Allegro
Adagio
Allegro
Concerto No. 5 in E minor, RV 280
Allegro
Largo
Allegro
Concerto No. 6 in D minor, RV 239
Allegro
Largo
Allegro

Six Violin Concertos, Op. 06